Brandon Shane Drury (born August 21, 1992) is an American professional baseball utility player for the Los Angeles Angels of Major League Baseball (MLB). He has previously played in MLB for the Arizona Diamondbacks, New York Yankees, Toronto Blue Jays, New York Mets, Cincinnati Reds and San Diego Padres. He was drafted by the Atlanta Braves in 2010 and made his MLB debut with the Diamondbacks in 2015.

Career

Amateur career
Drury attended Grants Pass High School in Grants Pass, Oregon, where he played shortstop for the school's baseball team. He committed to play college baseball at Oregon State University.

Atlanta Braves
The Atlanta Braves selected Drury in the 13th round of the 2010 Major League Baseball draft. He signed and made his professional debut for the Gulf Coast Braves. He finished the year hitting .198/.248/.292 with three home runs over 192 at bats. In 2011, he played for the Danville Braves of the Rookie-level Appalachian League. In 63 games, he hit .347/.367/.525 with eight home runs in 265 at-bats. He was named the most valuable player of the Appalachian League along with Eddie Rosario. In 2012, while playing for the Rome Braves of the Class A South Atlantic League, he hit only .229/.270/.333 with six home runs in 445 at-bats.

Arizona Diamondbacks

On January 24, 2013, the Braves traded Drury, along with Martín Prado, Randall Delgado, Zeke Spruill, and Nick Ahmed to the Arizona Diamondbacks for Justin Upton and Chris Johnson. He played his first season in the Diamondbacks organization with the South Bend Silver Hawks. In 134 games, he hit .302/.362/.500 with 15 home runs. He started the 2014 season for the Visalia Rawhide of the Class A-Advanced California League, and in August was promoted to the Mobile BayBears of the Class AA Southern League. He had a .299 batting average, 23 home runs and 95 RBI. After the season, Drury was sent to the Arizona Fall League, where he played for the Salt River Rafters.

In 2015, the Diamondbacks invited Drury to spring training and assigned him to Mobile to begin the season. On June 23, he was promoted to the Reno Aces of the Class AAA Pacific Coast League. The Diamondbacks called Drury up to the major leagues on September 1, 2015, and he made his debut that day. Drury collected his first major league hit, a single, off Colorado Rockies pitcher Jon Gray. Drury hit his first home run on September 22, off Los Angeles Dodgers pitcher Adam Liberatore.

Due to his strong offensive performance, Drury was mentioned as a possible backup outfielder during spring training in 2016. He became one of the last players to make the Diamondbacks 2016 Opening Day roster. The Diamondbacks occasionally started Drury in the outfield as well as second and third base to keep his bat in the lineup. Drury was optioned to Reno to clear a roster spot for Shelby Miller on June 19, despite hitting .275/.313/.456 up to that point in the season. The Diamondbacks recalled Drury on June 24, a day after outfielder Socrates Brito had fractured a toe on his right foot.

New York Yankees
On February 20, 2018, the Diamondbacks traded Drury to the New York Yankees in a three-team trade, where they acquired Steven Souza from the Tampa Bay Rays and Taylor Widener from the Yankees, while the Rays also acquired Nick Solak from the Yankees and Anthony Banda and two player to be named later (Colin Poche and Sam McWilliams) from the Diamondbacks.

On April 6, 2018, Drury left the game due to blurred vision and migraines. The next day, on April 7, Drury was placed on the 10-day disabled list due to severe migraines. On May 14, he was activated from the disabled list, and optioned to Triple-A Scranton/Wilkes Barre.

Toronto Blue Jays

On July 26, 2018, the Yankees traded Drury and Billy McKinney to the Toronto Blue Jays for J. A. Happ. Drury was placed on the disabled list on August 7 with a broken left hand, eight games into his tenure with the Blue Jays. In 2019, Drury played the majority of the season, appearing at multiple positions, despite having a second straight season in which he struggled offensively. Overall, Drury hit .218 with 15 home runs and 41 runs batted in. On September 1, 2020, Drury was designated for assignment by the Blue Jays. To that point in the season, Drury had hit .152/.184/.174 over 49 plate appearances. He was outrighted on September 4. Drury elected free agency on October 6, 2020.

New York Mets

On January 5, 2021, Drury signed a minor league contract with the New York Mets organization. He began the 2021 season with the Syracuse Mets of Triple-A East. On May 21, the Mets selected Drury to their active roster. He hit his first home run as a Met on May 24, a ninth inning pinch hit home run off Austin Gomber of the Colorado Rockies.  He batted .274 with four home runs for the Mets before he was designated for assignment on October 2. On October 14, Drury elected free agency.

Cincinnati Reds
On March 21, 2022, Drury signed a minor league contract with the Cincinnati Reds. On April 5, it was announced that Drury had made the Reds’ Opening Day roster. Drury ended up as the starting third baseman and had a breakout year, with him being considered the Reds best offensive player of the first half, and some arguing that he deserved to be an All-Star.

San Diego Padres
On August 2, 2022, the Reds traded Drury to the San Diego Padres for Victor Acosta. He hit a grand slam on the first pitch that he saw as a Padre on August 3.

Los Angeles Angels
On December 22, 2022, Drury signed a 2 year, $17 million contract with the Los Angeles Angels.

References

External links

 

1992 births
Living people
American expatriate baseball players in Canada
Arizona Diamondbacks players
Baseball players from Oregon
Danville Braves players
Cincinnati Reds players
Gulf Coast Braves players
Major League Baseball first basemen
Major League Baseball second basemen
Major League Baseball third basemen
Mobile BayBears players
New York Mets players
New York Yankees players
Reno Aces players
Rome Braves players
Salt River Rafters players
San Diego Padres players
Silver Slugger Award winners
South Bend Silver Hawks players
Sportspeople from Grants Pass, Oregon
Syracuse Mets players
Toronto Blue Jays players
Visalia Rawhide players